D406 branches off to the southwest from D8 near Prizna towards Prizna ferry port - ferry access to Žigljen, island of Pag (D106). The road is 2.9 km long.

The road, as well as all other state roads in Croatia, is managed and maintained by Hrvatske ceste, state owned company.

Traffic volume 

Traffic is not regularly counted on the road, however, Hrvatske ceste report number of vehicles using Prizna-Žigljen ferry line, connecting D406 to the D106 state road. Substantial variations between annual (AADT) and summer (ASDT) traffic volumes are attributed to the fact that the road connects to a number of summer resorts.

Road junctions and populated areas

Sources

State roads in Croatia
Lika-Senj County